Sumner Bridge is a historic structure located in Sumner, Iowa, United States. In June 1916 the Fayette County Board of Supervisors agreed with the supervisors in Bremer County to build this bridge on the county line. The agreement was for Bremer County to take the lead on the planning and for both counties to share the costs. Fred Boedeker was awarded a contract for $7,058 to build this concrete deck girder bridge designed by the Iowa State Highway Commission. The three span structure features concrete abutments and piers with bullnosed cutwaters. The bridge was listed on the National Register of Historic Places in 1998.

See also

References

Bridges completed in 1917
Bridges in Fayette County, Iowa
National Register of Historic Places in Fayette County, Iowa
Road bridges on the National Register of Historic Places in Iowa
Concrete bridges in the United States
Girder bridges in the United States